Metropolis is an album by the Italian singer-songwriter Francesco Guccini, released in 1981 by Emi Italiana.

Track listing 
All songs by Francesco Guccini, with the exception of "Venezia" by Biggi-Alloisio, and "Milano (poveri bimbi di)" by Guccini-Alloisio-Guccini.
"Bisanzio" (5:14)
"Venezia"  (4:06)
"Antenòr"  (5:19)
"Bologna" (4:41)
"Lager" (3:46)
"Black-out" (3:56)
"Milano (poveri bimbi di)" (4:53)

1981 albums
Francesco Guccini albums
EMI Records albums

it:Metropolis#Musica